The 2014 International Tennis Tournament of Cortina was a professional tennis tournament played on clay courts. It was the 1st edition of the tournament which was part of the 2014 ATP Challenger Tour. It took place in Cortina d'Ampezzo, Italy, between 28 July and 3 August 2014.

Singles main-draw entrants

Seeds

 1 Rankings are as of July 21, 2014.

Other entrants
The following players received wildcards into the singles main draw:
  Simone Bolelli 
  Federico Gaio
  Daniel Gimeno Traver 
  Stefano Napolitano

The following players received entry from the qualifying draw:
  Pietro Fanucci 
  Guillaume Rufin
  Viktor Troicki
  Adelchi Virgili

The following player received a special exemption into the singles main draw:
  Giovanni Lapentti

The following player entered using a protected ranking:
  Iñigo Cervantes

The following players received entry by a lucky loser spot:
  Karim Hossam
  Boris Pašanski
  Walter Trusendi

Withdrawals
  Simone Bolelli  
  Peter Gojowczyk
  Maxime Teixeira

Champions

Singles

  Filip Krajinović def.  Federico Gaio 2–6, 7–6(7–5), 7–5

Doubles

  Iñigo Cervantes Huegun /  Juan Lizariturry def.  Lee Hsin-han /  Vahid Mirzadeh 7–5, 3–6, [10–8]

External links
Official website

International Tennis Tournament of Cortina
International Tennis Tournament of Cortina
International Tennis Tournament of Cortina
International Tennis Tournament of Cortina
International Tennis Tournament of Cortina